Mišeluk is a neighborhood of the city of Novi Sad in Serbia.

Geography
Mišeluk is located in Syrmian part of Novi Sad, between Petrovaradin and Sremska Kamenica. Administratively, Mišeluk is regarded as part of Petrovaradin. It is divided into 3 parts: Mišeluk 1, Mišeluk 2, and Mišeluk 3.

History

During NATO bombing of Novi Sad in 1999, buildings of the Radio Television Novi Sad in Mišeluk were devastated by NATO bombs.

Population
Currently, Mišeluk neighborhood is sparsely inhabited, but city authorities are currently planning for Mišeluk to become a central neighborhood in the Syrmian part of Novi Sad. With planned 40,000 future residents, it will be larger than Petrovaradin and Sremska Kamenica.

Events

Mišeluk is the site of largest annual auto-moto racing championship in Serbia (and formerly in Yugoslavia).

See also
Neighborhoods of Novi Sad

References

Jovan Mirosavljević, Brevijar ulica Novog Sada 1745-2001, Novi Sad, 2002.

External links 

www.misheluk.com

Novi Sad neighborhoods
Motorsport venues in Serbia